Daniel Greene Littlefield (November 23, 1822 – May 31, 1891) was a haircloth mill owner in Central Falls, Rhode Island and Lieutenant Governor of Rhode Island for one term 1889–1890.

Early life
Littlefield was born in North Kingstown, Rhode Island but his family moved to Scituate, Rhode Island when he was young. Starting at age eight, Littlefield worked in the cotton and wollen mills of Scituate, working his way up from bobbin boy to superintendent. From 1846-1863, Littlefield lived in Florence, Massachusetts, where he managed various woolen mills and also operated a general store with his brothers George and Alfred. Daniel's younger brother Alfred later went on to become Governor of Rhode Island.

Pawtucket Hair Cloth Company

In 1863 came the career move that would define the rest of his life: the manufacture of haircloth, which is a stiff fabric made from the hair of a horse's mane or tail. He established the Pawtucket Hair Cloth Company, setting up the factory and placing the equipment. He had intended to only stay in Rhode Island for a year and return to Massachusetts, but the factory was so profitable that he decided to spend the rest of his life in Central Falls, serving as president of the Pawtucket Hair Cloth Company.

Littlefield traveled extensively in Europe, visiting "all the principal countries" and making a particularly long visit to Southern Russia, the "great horsehair market of the world." During his travels, Littlefield was named honorary commissioner from Rhode Island to the Paris Exposition.

Political life
Littlefield started his political career as a Whig, but joined the Republican Party on its formation. He served in the Massachusetts assembly in 1861 and 1862, and then became Lieutenant Governor of Rhode Island in 1889.

Personal life
Littlefield married Maria B. Collins in 1843, and on her death in 1866 he married Maria Antoinette McMurry of New York. He had four daughters by his first wife, only one of whom lived to adulthood, and she died at age 20. He had two children with his second wife, Leland H. and Florence A.

Littlefield was a member and trustee of the Pawtucket Congregational Church. Physically, he was a large and imposing figure at over six feet tall.

Littlefield owned a mansion at Broad and Central Streets in Central Falls that was said to be one of the finest in town. He died in his home on May 31, 1891 and was buried at Swan Point Cemetery.

References

Lieutenant Governors of Rhode Island
1822 births
1891 deaths
People from Central Falls, Rhode Island
Burials at Swan Point Cemetery
American industrialists
Rhode Island Whigs
19th-century American politicians
Rhode Island Republicans
Businesspeople from Rhode Island
People from North Kingstown, Rhode Island
People from Scituate, Rhode Island
19th-century American businesspeople